Ligustrum sinense (Chinese privet; syn. L. villosum; in Mandarin: 杻; pinyin: chǒu) is a species of privet native to China, Taiwan and Vietnam, and naturalized in Réunion, the Andaman Islands, Norfolk Island, Costa Rica, Honduras, Panamá and much of the eastern and southern United States (from Texas and Florida north to Kansas, Illinois, New Jersey, Massachusetts and Connecticut). The name "Chinese privet" may also refer to Ligustrum lucidum.

Description 
Ligustrum sinense is a deciduous shrub growing to 2–7 m tall, with densely hairy shoots. The leaves are opposite, 2–7 cm long and 1–3 cm broad, rarely larger, with an entire margin and a 2–8 mm petiole. The flowers are white, with a four-lobed corolla 3.5–5.5 mm long. The fruit is subglobose, 5–8 mm diameter, and considered poisonous.

Varieties 
The following varieties are accepted by the Flora of China:
Ligustrum sinense var. sinense
Ligustrum sinense var. concavum 
Ligustrum sinense var. coryanum 
Ligustrum sinense var. dissimile 
Ligustrum sinense var. luodianense 
Ligustrum sinense var. myrianthum 
Ligustrum sinense var. opienense 
Ligustrum sinense var. rugosulum

Cultivation and uses

It is cultivated as an ornamental plant and for hedges. Several cultivars have been selected, including the very floriferous 'Multiflorum', the variegated cultivar 'Variegatum', and the dwarf cultivar 'Wimbei' growing to 0.5 m and with leaves only 6 mm long.

It was introduced to North America to be used for hedges and landscaping where it has now escaped from cultivation and is listed as an invasive plant in southeastern states.  It is estimated that Chinese privet now occupies over one million hectares of land across 12 states ranging from Virginia to Florida and west to Texas, with detrimental effects to biodiversity and forest health.

Etymology
Ligustrum means 'binder'. It was named by Pliny and Virgil.

See also
Privet as an invasive plant

References

External links 
Species Profile - Chinese Privet (Ligustrum sinense), National Invasive Species Information Center, United States National Agricultural Library

sinense
Flora of China
Flora of Taiwan
Flora of Vietnam
Plants used in bonsai
Plants described in 1790